is a former Japanese football player.

Playing career
Kawashima was born in Shizuoka on July 20, 1978. After graduating from Shimizu Commercial High School, he joined the J1 League club Sanfrecce Hiroshima in 1997. He debuted as a center back in 1998 and played many matches as a substitute in 2000. However he did not play much in 2001. In July 2001, he moved to the Urawa Reds. However, he did not play at all there. In 2002, he returned to Sanfrecce Hiroshima. Although he was a regular player in early 2002, he did not play at all in July. In September 2002, he moved to the J2 League club Avispa Fukuoka. He played as a regular player until 2003. However, his playing time gradually decreased in 2004. Although he played often in 2007, he moved to the newly promoted J2 League club, FC Gifu. He played as a regular player in 2008. However his playing time gradually decreased in 2009 and he did not play at all in 2012. He retired at the end of the 2012 season.

Club statistics

References

External links

1978 births
Living people
Association football people from Shizuoka Prefecture
Japanese footballers
J1 League players
J2 League players
Sanfrecce Hiroshima players
Urawa Red Diamonds players
Avispa Fukuoka players
FC Gifu players
Association football defenders